Moldovița is a commune located in Suceava County, Bukovina, northeastern Romania. It is composed of four villages: namely Argel, Demăcușa, Moldovița, and Rașca.

A Latin-rite Catholic Diocese of Moldovița with see here existed from 1418 to 1550.

Demographics 

According to the 2002 Romanian census, there were 5,021 people living in the commune. The national composition thereof was:

As for language, in 2002 the composition was:

Administration and local politics

Communal council 

The commune's current local council has the following political composition, according to the results of the 2020 Romanian local elections:

Gallery

Notes

References 

Communes in Suceava County
Localities in Southern Bukovina